This is an alphabetical list of 15 baseball players from Nicaragua who appeared in Major League Baseball between 1976 and 2019.

Players

References
Players born in Nicaragua - Baseball-Reference.com

 
Nicaragua
Baseball players